Dai Hoa is a commune the district of Đại Lộc District, Quảng Nam Province, Vietnam. The local economy is mainly agricultural, particularly rice production. The commune has an area of 71.2 square kilometers. It has a population of 6,743 inhabitants (as of 2008).
This commune borders the Thu Bồn River to the north, (Duy Xuyên District of Quảng Nam), Ái Nghĩa town to the north, Đại An commune to the west.
It includes villages: Quảng Huế, Hoà Thạch, Giao Thuỷ, Mỹ Hoà, Lộc Bình, Bộ Nam, Bàu Tây, Giáo Tây, Ái Mỹ, Bộ Bắc, Thượng Phước

Communes of Quảng Nam province
Populated places in Quảng Nam province